Associazione Sportiva Dilettantistica Itala San Marco Gradisca (usually abbreviated to I.S.M. Gradisca) is an Italian association football club located in Gradisca d'Isonzo, Friuli-Venezia Giulia. Currently it plays in Prima Categoria, the 7h tier of Italian football pyramid.

History
A.S.D. Itala San Mrco Gradisca was founded in 1919 as Società Sportiva Itala di Gradisca.

U.S. Itala San Marco
In 1978 the club was renamed U.S. Itala San Marco and played in Lega Pro Seconda Divisione, after having been crowned as Serie D/C winners in 2007–08.

Following its withdrawal at the end of the 2009–10 Lega Pro Seconda Divisione season, the club was forced out of business.

A.S.D. I.S.M. Gradisca
In the summer of 2010, a new team with the current denomination was formed and was promoted from Eccellenza Friuli – Venezia Giulia to Serie D at the end of the 2010–11 season. In the season 2011–12 it was relegated to Eccellenza.

Colors and badge
The team's colours are white and dark blue.

References

External links
 Official homepage

Football clubs in Italy
Football clubs in Friuli-Venezia Giulia
Association football clubs established in 1919
Serie C clubs
1919 establishments in Italy